The FIVB World Grand Prix 2009 is a women's volleyball tournament that was played by 12 countries from 31 July to 23 August 2009. The finals were held at the Tokyo Metropolitan Gymnasium in Tokyo, Japan. Brazil, United States, Dominican Republic and  Puerto Rico qualified for the tournament at the 2008 Women's Pan-American Cup in Mexicali and Tijuana, Mexico.

Competing nations
The following national teams  qualified:

Teams

Calendar

Preliminary rounds

Ranking
The host Japan and top five teams in the preliminary round advance to the Final round.

|}

First round

Group A

|}

Group B

|}

Group C

|}

Second round

Group D

|}

Group E

|}

Group F

|}

Third round

Group G

|}

Group H

|}

Group I

|}

Final round
Venue– Tokyo Metropolitan Gymnasium, Tokyo

|}

Final ranking

|}

Overall ranking

Individual awards

Most Valuable Player:

Best Spiker:

Best Blocker:

Best Server:

Best Libero:

Best Setter:

Best Scorer:

References
FIVB official site

FIVB World Grand Prix
2009 in Japanese sport
International volleyball competitions hosted by Japan
2009
Sports competitions in Tokyo